Omar & Salma is an Egyptian film starring Tamer Hosny and Mai Ezz Eldin, written by Hosny. It was the first of a trilogy.

References

External links

2000s romance films
2007 films
2000s Arabic-language films
Egyptian romance films
Fictional couples